Harry Grundy (18 September 1893–1979) was an English footballer who played in the Football League for Oldham Athletic.

References

1893 births
1979 deaths
English footballers
Association football defenders
English Football League players
Oldham Athletic A.F.C. players